Jarmo Jokila (born February 13, 1986 in Lemu) is a Finnish ice hockey player who currently plays for Podhale Nowy Targ in the Polska Hokej Liga, the top-level ice hockey league in Poland.

His brother Janne is also a professional ice hockey player, drafted by NHL team Columbus Blue Jackets in 2000 and currently playing for Milton Keynes Lightning in the UK.

References

External links

1986 births
Living people
SaiPa players
Finnish ice hockey left wingers
HC TPS players
HC '05 Banská Bystrica players
HK Nitra players
Stjernen Hockey players
SønderjyskE Ishockey players
Podhale Nowy Targ players
MAC Budapest players
Omaha Lancers players
Finnish expatriate ice hockey players in Slovakia
Finnish expatriate ice hockey players in the United States
Finnish expatriate ice hockey players in Norway
Finnish expatriate ice hockey players in Sweden
Finnish expatriate ice hockey players in Denmark
Finnish expatriate ice hockey players in Poland
Finnish expatriate ice hockey players in Hungary